Elias Dolah (born 24 April 1993) is a professional footballer who plays as a centre back for Thai League 1 club Port. Born in Sweden, Dolah plays for the Thailand national team.

Personal life
Dolah was born in Sweden from a Swedish mother and Thai-Malay father from Narathiwat. Dolah’s grandparents originate from the Malaysian state of Kelantan, thus making him eligible to represent either Sweden, Thailand or Malaysia at international level.

International career
On 2019, Dolah was named in Akira Nishino’s squad for Thailand’s 2022 World Cup qualification.

Career statistics

International

International Goals 
Scores and results list Thailand's goal tally first.

Honours

Clubs
Port
 Thai FA Cup (1): 2019

International
Thailand
 AFF Championship (1): 2020

References

External links
Elias Dolah at Soccerway

1993 births
Living people
Sportspeople from Lund
Elias Dolah
Elias Dolah
Elias Dolah
Swedish footballers
Elias Dolah
Elias Dolah
Swedish people of Thai descent
Swedish people of Malay descent
Association football defenders
Ettan Fotboll players
Lunds BK players
FC Rosengård 1917 players
Elias Dolah
Elias Dolah
Elias Dolah
Elias Dolah